Stephen Andrew Rudd (December 11, 1874 – March 31, 1936) was an American politician who served as a member of the United States House of Representatives for New York's 9th congressional district from 1931 to 1936.

Early life
He was born on December 11, 1874, in Brooklyn, the son of Assemblyman Robert J. Rudd.

Career 
He was elected as a Democrat to the 71st United States Congress, to fill the vacancy caused by the death of David J. O'Connell, and was re-elected to the 72nd, 73rd and 74th United States Congresses, holding office from February 17, 1931, until his death on March 31, 1936.

Personal life 
He died on March 31, 1936, in Brooklyn, New York City, aged 61. State Senator Roy H. Rudd (1906–1997) was his son.

See also
 List of United States Congress members who died in office (1900–49)

References

External links 
 

1874 births
1936 deaths
Burials at the Cemetery of the Evergreens
Politicians from Brooklyn
St. Lawrence University alumni
Democratic Party members of the United States House of Representatives from New York (state)